William Duncan Silkworth (1873– 1951), was an American medical doctor and specialist in the treatment of alcoholism. He was director of the Charles B. Towns Hospital for Drug and Alcohol Addictions in New York City in the 1930s, during which time William Griffith Wilson, a future co-founder of Alcoholics Anonymous (A.A.), was admitted on three occasions for alcoholism. Dr. Silkworth had a profound influence on Wilson and encouraged him to realize that alcoholism was more than just an issue of moral weakness. He introduced Wilson to the idea that alcoholism had a pathological, disease-like basis.

Early Life

Birthplace 
William Duncan Silkworth was born in Brooklyn on 22 July 1873 to parents William Silkworth and Isabelle Silkworth, née Duncan. William was the eldest of three siblings; he had a younger brother named Russel and a younger sister named Mabel.

Education 
Silkworth attended Long Branch High School (then called Chattle High School), which was a three year program when he began studying there. At the end of Silkworth's third year, the school authorities announced that they were converting the school to a four-year program. Aggrieved, Silkworth refused to return for a fourth year as he had already been accepted to Princeton University (then called the College of New Jersey). 

Between 1892 and 1896, Silkworth obtained a Bachelor's degree from Princeton University. It would take Silkworth several years to obtain a high school diploma; during which time, he was able to study at Princeton because the college authorities proved willing to overlook the fact that he technically had not graduated high school provided that he maintained excellent academic standings. Silkworth began his university studies as a pre-med student, but quickly developed an interest and began to specialize in neuropsychiatry. 

Upon graduating from Princeton, Silkworth studied at Bellevue Hospital Medical College beginning in 1896 and graduating with a Medical Degree in 1899 after completing the four year program in three years. While interning at Bellevue Hospital, Dr. Silkworth was exposed to many alcoholics and doctors with expertise on alcoholism since Bellevue was one of the only hospitals with a department specializing in the treatment of alcoholism in the United States at the time.

Marriage 
Silkworth married Marie Antoinette Bennett in Manhattan on July 22, 1898. On February 27, 1909, his wife gave birth to a bot who lived for only six days before passing away on March 4, 1909. The couple would have no other children, though they remained married all their lives.

Treatment of alcoholism 
During Dr. Silkworth's career, he is estimated to have treated more than 40,000 alcoholics in his career and was regarded as one of the world's leading experts in the field. In 1937, Dr. Silkworth published a pair of articles in the Medical Record titled "Alcoholism as a Manifestation of Allergy" and "Reclamation of the Alcoholic" wherein he proposed a physical disease model of alcoholism and a psychotherapeutic treatment method that induced patients to admit powerlessness over their addiction and to adopt a new moral psychology. In the latter paper, Dr. Silkworth describes five case studies of patients that he had treated for alcoholism at the Towns Hospital; in Case V, Dr. Silkworth describes the successful recovery of Bill Wilson who was already in the early stages of founding the organization that would come to be known as Alcoholics Anonymous.

The Doctor's Opinion 
During 1938 and 1939, Dr. Silkworth wrote letters in support of Alcoholics Anonymous which were included in a chapter titled "The Doctor's Opinion" in the book Alcoholics Anonymous and helped to provide the nascent organization with credibility. Crucially, he described the powerlessness of alcoholism as an obsession of the mind that compels one to drink and an allergy of the body that condemns one to go mad or die. Dr. Silkworth further observed that alcoholics could recover if they could obtain an essential psychic change brought about with the aid of a "Higher Power."

End of life 
Dr. Silkworth died on 22 March 1951 after suffering a heart attack. He is buried at the Glenwood Cemetery in West Long Branch, New Jersey.

See also
 History of Alcoholics Anonymous

References

External links 
Writings, articles, letters and documents of William Duncan Silkworth
William Duncan Silkworth (Biography)
Mitchel, D. (2002). Silkworth: The little doctor who loved drunks. Hazelden Betty Ford Library.

1873 births
1951 deaths
Alcoholics Anonymous
American addiction physicians
Bellevue Hospital Medical College alumni
Long Branch High School alumni
People from Brooklyn
People from Long Branch, New Jersey
Physicians from New Jersey
Princeton University alumni
Researchers in alcohol abuse